Spellbound (1941) is a British drama film directed by John Harlow. The film is based on the 1909 novel The Necromancers by Robert Hugh Benson. The film was released in the US in 1945 under the titles of Ghost Story and The Spell of Amy Nugent to avoid confusion with Alfred Hitchcock's Spellbound, released later in 1945.

Premise
A young man is distraught after losing his fiancée to a terminal illness. He soon becomes involved with a group of spiritualists in order to contact her. This leads to a frightening series of events.

Cast
 Derek Farr ...  Laurie Baxter
 Vera Lindsay ...  Diana Hilton
 Hay Petrie ...  Mr. Cathcart
 Felix Aylmer ...  Mr. Morton
 Frederick Leister ...  Mr. Vincent
 Marian Spencer ...  Mrs. Stapleton
 Diana King ...  Amy Nugent
 W.G. Fay ...  Johnnie
 Winifred Davis ...  Mrs. Baxter
 Enid Hewit ...  Lady Laura Bethel
 Gibb McLaughlin ...  Gibb
 Cameron Hall ...  Mr. Nugent
 Irene Handl ...  Mrs. Nugent
 Hannen Swaffer ...  Himself

References

External links
 
 
 

1941 films
1941 drama films
Films directed by John Harlow
British black-and-white films
Films based on British novels
British drama films
1940s English-language films
1940s British films